Boticas is a municipality in northern Portugal. The population in 2011 was 5,750, in an area of 321.96 km2.

History
One of the symbols of Boticas is the Galaico Warrior, an anthropomorphic carved monolith (found in the 17th century) in the castro of Lesenho, at an altitude of 1075 metres, under fields of the parish of São Salvador de Viveiro and municipality of Boticas, considered the most important Gallaecian castro in Portugal. The Galaico (or "Castrejo") Warrior is an important example of Portuguese archaeology and represents, according to several experts, the image of a deity and warrior of the "castreja" civilisation that lived in this area of Portugal.

There were several castros (27) dating back to this early civilization, in addition to various Roman monuments. Boticas has its origins in the Roman civitas Batocas, that was centre of mining, and its Termas de Carvalhelhos, thermal springs with (supposedly) rejuvenating miracle waters. Coins from the period of Byzantine Emperor Constantine X Doukas were also found in Covas de Barroso in 1880, in addition to vestiges in Poços das Freitas or the mines of Carvalhelhos, where Romans were known to have mined gold and silver.

No later than 314, Boticas (or Betecas) also became a diocese, as the episcopal term of its only recorded bishop, Sabino (death unknown), starts then. It was presumably suppressed around 400, without direct successor see.

Waves of barbarian tribes and Moorish invaders crossed the lands of Boticas during the Middle Ages (many of the local toponymic names reflect this period, such as Côto dos Mouros, Penedo dos Mouros, Estrada dos Mouros, Cova da Moura, Moura Encantada and Mouril).

The municipality of Boticas was historically part of the Terras de Barroso an administrative division that existed from the 13th the 19th century; many people in the area have the surname Barroso and this term is still used today to refer to the geographical region and distinctive culture of Boticas together with the neighbouring municipality of Montalegre. The first use of the name Barroso came from lineage of the Guedeões (taken from a tower in the locality of Sipiões), whose progeny would adopt and permeate the lands of Botica. King Afonso II tried to unite the lands of the Barrosos in 1273, but was unable.

It was Egas Gomes Barroso, son of Gomes Mendes Guedeão and his wife Chamôa Mendes de Sousa, both members of the nobility of Count Peter (son of King Denis of Portugal), who were grandchildren of Gueda "The Older". Egas, a rich man during the reigns of Kings Sancho II and Afonso III, went in 1247 (in the reign of the latter) to Seville to support King Ferdinand III "The Saint" in Castile. Egas' sons formed two distinct lineages: the Bastos, descendants of his second son, Gomes Viegas de Basto; and the Barroso, descendants of Gonçalo Viegas Barroso and Maria Fernandes de Lima. The Barrosos, were the predominant line, fixing themselves in Braga and Barcelos, becoming signeurs and administrators of the lands of the Trás-os-Montes.

Afonso IV continued the process of uniting and defending the territory in 1331, constructing castles and walls around the castle of Montalegre. King Ferdinand donated the lands to Rui Vasques Pereira in 1367, and later to Vasco Gonçalves Barroso. The lands of Boticas changed hands frequently thereafter, until John I finally donated the lands to his friend Nuno Alvares Pereira: the territory would remain in the hands of the Duke of Braganza and their descendants.

With a resident population of over 6000 inhabitants in 2001, the municipality was only recently established. It was a creation during the Liberalist regimes of the 19th century, along with the great administrative reforms that developed after the second Liberal Revolution (1832). The municipality of Boticas was legally and definitely established by a 6 November 1836 decree, with parishes de-annexed from the neighbouring municipalities of Chaves and Montalegre, along with the extinction of the municipality of Dornelas and the ancient lands of the Barroso nobility. Other toponymic locations (such as the settlements of Alturas do Barroso and Covas do Barroso), administrative divisions and territory, which also extended to the municipality of Montalegre and the extinct municipality of Ruivães (now part of the municipality of Vieira do Minho), also corresponded to lands of the Barroso family. Boticas, already a central place, was, since the municipality was created, the municipal seat.

Geography

Physical geography 
The municipality of Boticas is situated in the northwest part of the Alto Trás-os-Montes in the district of Vila Real, surrounded by five other municipalities: to the north, the municipalities of Montalegre and Chaves, to the south by the Ribeira de Pena; to the east by Chaves and Vila Pouca de Aguiar; and to the west by the municipalities of Montalegre and Cabeceiras de Basto. Its area extends from the Tâmega River until the Serra das Alturas and Serras de Melcas, in addition to the Serra dos Marcos until the Serras do Leiranco and Serra de Pastoria. It is part of the group of municipalities referred to as the Alto Tâmega, integrated into the legendary "Region of the Barroso", that is constituted by a compact mass of highlands, accented topography, peaks and sierras separated by large depressions.

There are primarily two agricultural zones: the lowlands, formed by the interior watershed of the Terva and Beça Rivers (site of vineyards, orchards and cereal fields); and the highlands, (constituted by pasturelands used for cultivation of olive trees, vineyards, potato and rye fields).

Climate 
The climate is cold, but dry, conditioned by numerous factors, such as the latitude, altitude, its proximity to the ocean and the predominant vegetation. Its winters are characterized by long cold periods, interspersed by snowfalls and ice-storms, with several weeks of below zero temperatures. The spring, by rule, is very cool, and susceptible to cold-streaks until May, when the vegetation blooms. Summer temperatures are over 35/40 °C.

Human geography 

Administratively, the municipality is divided into 10 civil parishes (freguesias):
 Alturas do Barroso e Cerdedo
 Ardãos e Bobadela
 Beça
 Boticas e Granja
 Codessoso, Curros e Fiães do Tâmega
 Covas do Barroso 
 Dornelas
 Pinho
 Sapiãos
 Vilar e Viveiro

Economy 
Boticas is known for vinho dos mortos.  During the invasion of the French army between 1807 and 1809 the inhabitants buried their locally produced wine in the sandy soil rather than let it fall into the hands of the enemy. After Napoleon's army, led by General Andoche Junot, was gone, they dug up the bottles. Initially fearing that the wine had spoiled, the locals found the low temperatures and darkness seemed to concentrate the flavors and improve the taste.  The practice of burying them for about two years it still routine and the wine is sold under the title of Vinho Regional Transmontano with the label of Armindo Sousa Pereira.

Culture 
The municipality is marked by the local gastronomy, which includes the local presunto, stuffed trout, smoked-meats and Barrosan veal.

Architecture

Civic 
 Calvário de Covas do Barroso - a sacred road composed of several pillory-like crosses in the parish of Covas do Barroso;
 Castro do Lesenho
 Castro de Carvalheiros
 Guerreiro Galaico - located in São Salvador de Viveiro, an erect anthropomorphic sculpture, encountered in the 18th century in the Castro of Lesenho, Campos, parish of São Salvador de Viveiro, and classified as an object of public interest (Decree 29/17 July 1990); the statue of a short-hair, moustache and bearded-warrior in short-sleeve uniform decorated with geometric motifs and concentric circles, carrying a round shield in his left hand. The Guerreiro Calaico or Castrejo, is one of the oldest archaeological vestiges of Lusitania, the four statues are on permanent display in the National Archaeological and Etymological Museum in Lisbon, while replicas are on public display in front of the municipal hall of Boticas;
 Moínhos de Água - several mills located scattered throughout the municipality;

Religious 
 Roman Church of Beça
 Roman Church of Covas de Barroso
 Gothic Church of Lampiões

See also 
 List of Catholic dioceses in Portugal

References 
Notes

Sources
 
 
 
 

Towns in Portugal
Municipalities of Vila Real District